Shirin Su (also Romanized as Shīrīn Sū and Shīrīn Soo; also known as Shīrūnsū) is a city and capital of Shirin Su District, in Kabudarahang County, Hamadan Province, Iran. At the 2006 census, its population was 2,280, in 507 families.

References

Kabudarahang County

Cities in Hamadan Province